Gu County or Guxian is a county in the south of Shanxi Province, China, under the administration of the prefecture-level city of Linfen. The county spans an area of 1,196 square kilometers, and has a population of 91,798 as of 2010.

History 
The area was first incorporated under Emperor Xiaozhuang of the Northern Wei Dynasty in 528 CE under the name Anze County. The county was placed under the administration of  upon its formation in 596 CE, during the Sui Dynasty.

In 606 CE the Anze County was renamed to Yueyang County. Yueyang County underwent numerous boundary changes, but retained its name until 1914, when its name was reverted to Anze County.

In August 1971, Gu County was formed with seven townships from Anze County and three from Fushan County. In 1973, the county center was built up from Zhangjiagou Village and Wanli Village.

Geography 
Gu County spans an area of 1,196 kilometers, and ranges in altitude from 590 meters to 2,346 meters in height. The main rivers which flow through the county include the Jian River, the Shibi River, the Lin River, the Guxian River, and the Caizi River.

Climate

Administrative divisions 
The county is divided into four towns and three townships.

References

County-level divisions of Shanxi